Winner is a surname. Notable people with the surname include:

 Albertine Winner (19071988), British physician and medical administrator
 Charley Winner (born 1924), American football coach
 David Winner (author) (born 1956), English author and journalist
 David Winner (soccer) (born 1971), retired American soccer goalkeeper
 Joseph Winner (18371918), American composer
 Langdon Winner, American philosopher of technology
 Lauren Winner, American writer and educator
 Michael Winner (19352013), English film director, television personality, and food critic
 Reality Winner (born 1991), American accused of leaking intelligence documents
 Septimus Winner (18271902), American songwriter